Jacobus Frederick Beatrix 'Piston' van Wyk  (born 21 December 1943) is a former South African rugby union player.

Playing career
He made his test debut for the Springboks in 1970 against New Zealand at Loftus Versfeld in Pretoria and played in all four tests during the series against the touring All Blacks. In 1971 he played in the test series against France and Australia and in 1972, he was the hooker in the losing test against  at Ellis Park. He then played three tests against the 1974 British Lions and two tests against the 1976 All Blacks. He also played four tour matches for the Springboks.

Test history

See also
List of South Africa national rugby union players – Springbok no. 445

References

1943 births
Living people
South African rugby union players
South Africa international rugby union players
Blue Bulls players
Sharks (Currie Cup) players
People from Vereeniging
Rugby union players from Gauteng
Rugby union hookers